"", alternatively written "" (Now, dear soul, now it is time), is a Lutheran hymn for Epiphany, in five stanzas of six lines each, by Georg Weissel. It was first printed in 1642, set as a motet by Johannes Eccard. A version with an additional stanza is attributed to Johann Christoph Arnschwanger.

Hymnals indicate "" as the singing tune for both the five-stanza and six-stanza versions of the hymn. With this melody Johann Sebastian Bach used its last stanza in Part V of his Christmas Oratorio.

History 
Weissel was the pastor at the Altrossgarten Church in Königsberg, Prussia, from 1623 until his death in 1635. The hymn was first published in the first volume of Preußische Festlieder (Prussian festive songs) in Elbing in 1642. It appeared in hymnals such as Das Vollständige und vermehrte Leipziger Gesang-Buch (1729) in the section for Epiphany, and with "" given as its tune. Arnschwanger's six-stanza version was likewise adopted as a hymn for Epiphany to be sung to "", in hymnals such as the 1734 Ulmisches Kirchen-Gesang-Buch.

Text 
Weissel's hymn as published in Das Vollständige und vermehrte Leipziger Gesang-Buch (1729):
1.
2.
3.
4.
5.

Arnschwanger's version
A six-stanza version of the hymn is attributed to Johann Christoph Arnschwanger. Arnschwanger's additional stanza is inserted after the third stanza of Weissel's version, thus renumbering stanzas 4–5 of Weissel's hymn to 5–6 in this variant version:
4.

Musical settings

Eccard's motet
In the first publication in 1642, the hymn appeared in a six-part motet setting (SSATTB) by Johannes Eccard. It was recorded in 2013 by the RIAS Kammerchor, conducted by Hans-Christoph Rademann, as part of a Christmas collection. The motet is part of the Advent collection of the vocal ensemble Singer Pur, published by Schott Music in 2015.

Based on the hymn tune "In dich hab ich gehoffet, Herr"

Johann Sebastian Bach used the last stanza of the hymn, "" (Your radiance destroys all darkness), as a chorale, movement 46 in Part V of his Christmas Oratorio. The stanza was also translated as "All darkness flies" and "Your radiance consumes all darkness". Bach used a melody which Sethus Calvisius composed in 1581 for the hymn "" (Zahn 2461c). Part V of the Christmas Oratorio was first performed on 2 January 1735, the Sunday after New Year's Day.

Bach also used the Zahn 2461 hymn tune in other compositions:
 Chorale prelude In dich hab ich gehoffet, Herr, BWV 712;
 "" (text: first stanza of the hymn with the same name), sixth movement (closing chorale) of the cantata Falsche Welt, dir trau ich nicht, BWV 52;
 "" (text: fifth stanza of ""), 32nd movement (chorale) of St Matthew Passion, BWV 244;
 "" (text: seventh and last stanza of ""), fourth movement (closing chorus) of the cantata Gottes Zeit ist die allerbeste Zeit, BWV 106.

References

External links 
 
 BWV 248(5).46(4) bach-chorales.com

17th-century hymns in German
Lutheran hymns
1642 works
Songs about Jesus
Articles containing video clips